Ellesmere Port Catholic High School is a coeducational secondary school and sixth form located in the Whitby area of  Ellesmere Port in the English county of Cheshire.

It is a voluntary aided school administered by Cheshire West and Chester Council and the Roman Catholic Diocese of Shrewsbury.

Ellesmere Port Catholic High School offers GCSEs and BTECs as programmes of study for pupils, while students in the sixth form have the option to study from a range of A-levels.

References

External links
Ellesmere Port Catholic High School official website

Secondary schools in Cheshire West and Chester
Catholic secondary schools in the Diocese of Shrewsbury
Voluntary aided schools in England
Ellesmere Port